Allium commutatum is a species of Mediterranean onions in the amaryllis family. Its native range extends from Corsica and Algeria to Turkey.

Allium commutatum usually grows on rocky slopes overlooking the Mediterranean. Bulbs are resistant to salt and float, so they are very often dispersed by storms. Leaves wither and die before flowering time, when a tall scape appears bearing a large spherical umbel of purple flowers.

References

commutatum
Onions
Plants described in 1855
Flora of Malta